Gracie may refer to:

Names
 Gracie (name), a given name and a family name (includes a list of people with that name)
 Gracie family, a Brazilian family known for their practice and development of martial arts
 Hurricane Gracie, a 1959 Atlantic hurricane that affected the Bahamas and United States

Places
 Gracie Mansion, official residence for the New York City mayor

Arts, entertainment, and media

Fictional characters
Gracie, the shopkeeper in the 2006 television series Jericho

Film
 Gracie (film), a 2007 American film directed by Davis Guggenheim
 Gracie!, 2010 TV film on the life of the British singer Gracie Fields

Music
 "Gracie", a track on the album Home Cookin' (1959) by Jimmy Smith
 "Gracie", a song on the album Rockin' with Curly Leads (1973) by rock band The Shadows
 "Gracie", a track on the album Songs for Silverman (2005) by Ben Folds

Other uses
 Gracie Awards, presented by the Alliance for Women in Media Foundation
 Gracie (yacht), 19th century American racing sloop yacht built in 1868

See also
 Gracey (disambiguation)
 Gracy (disambiguation)